Luiz Otávio may refer to:
Luiz Otávio (footballer, born 1988), born Luiz Otávio Anacleto Leandro, Brazilian football defender
Luiz Otávio (footballer, born 1992), born Luiz Otávio da Silva Santos, Brazilian football defender
Luiz Otávio (footballer, born 1997), born Luiz Otávio Alves Marcolino, Brazilian football midfielder

See also
Tinga (footballer, born 1990), born Luiz Otávio Santos de Araújo, Brazilian football winger
Nenê Bonilha (born 1992), born Luis Otavio Bonilha de Oliveira, Brazilian football midfielder